Orange Ave. is the fourth studio album by American post-grunge band Seven Mary Three.  It was released on July 14, 1998, on Atlantic Records.  The album peaked at #121 on the Billboard 200.  The album is named after a street running through downtown Orlando, Florida, the band's hometown.

The album's only Billboard-charting single was "Over Your Shoulder" (#7 on Hot Mainstream Rock Tracks and #16 on Hot Modern Rock Tracks).  "Each Little Mystery" was also released as a single, but did not chart.

Critical reception
The A.V. Club wrote that "though Seven Mary Three still won't be mistaken for a creative dynamo—its diversity generally means there's a wider variety of forgettable rock songs from which to choose on Orange Ave.—it's certainly not so difficult to endure, sort of like the work of an accomplished but underwhelming bar band." The Sun Sentinel wrote that "by forgetting trends and focusing on their own experience, Seven Mary Three has made Orange Ave. a dark horse contender for the year's best rock album."

Track listing
All songs written and arranged by Seven Mary Three.

"Peel" – 2:08
"Over Your Shoulder" – 4:18
"Chasing You" – 3:38
"Each Little Mystery" – 2:45
"In-Between" – 3:09
"Joliet" – 4:20
"Super-Related" – 3:24
"Flagship Eleanor" – 3:01
"Southwestern State" – 4:41
"Hang On" – 2:58
"Blessing In Disguise" – 4:33
"Devil's Holy Joke" – 8:18
"Devil's Holy Joke" ends at 3:20, followed by the hidden track "Talk to You Like That" beginning at 4:16.

Album credits
 Jason Ross – lead vocals, rhythm guitar
 Jason Pollock – lead guitar, backing vocals
 Casey Daniel – bass
 Giti Khalsa – drums
 Kevin McKendree – keyboards
 Paul Smith – additional guitar

Production
Producers: Tom Morris, Jason Pollock, and Jason Ross
Engineering: Tom Morris with Matt Martone
Mixing: Tom Morris, except Tracks 3 and 5 mixed by Jack Joseph Puig
Mastering: Mike Fuller and Tom Morris
Art Direction: Larry Freemantle and Seven Mary Three
Photography: Danny Clinch

References

1998 albums
Seven Mary Three albums
Atlantic Records albums
Albums recorded at Morrisound Recording